Mala Danylivka is an urban-type settlement in Kharkiv Raion of Kharkiv Oblast in Ukraine. It is essentially a northern suburb of the city of Kharkiv and is located between Kharkiv and Derhachi on the banks of the Lopan and the Lozovenka rivers, in the drainage basin of the Don. Mala Danylivka hosts the administration of Mala Danylivka settlement hromada, one of the hromadas of Ukraine. Population: 

Until 18 July 2020, Mala Danylivka belonged to Derhachi Raion. The raion was abolished in July 2020 as part of the administrative reform of Ukraine, which reduced the number of raions of Kharkiv Oblast to seven. The area of Derhachi Raion was merged into Kharkiv Raion.

Economy

Transportation
Lozovenka and Pidhorodna railway stations are on the railway connecting Kharkiv and Belgorod. There is local passenger traffic between Kharkiv and Kozacha Lopan.

The settlement is adjacent to the Kharkiv Ring Road.

References

Urban-type settlements in Kharkiv Raion